Gualberto José Campos Reyes  (born April 24, 1981) is a retired Venezuelan footballer.

External links

goal.com

1981 births
Living people
People from Bolívar (state)
Venezuelan footballers
Association football midfielders
A.C.C.D. Mineros de Guayana players
Portuguesa F.C. players
Caracas FC players
FC Dinamo București players
Asociación Civil Deportivo Lara players
Aragua FC players
Carabobo F.C. players
Venezuelan expatriate footballers
Expatriate footballers in Romania
Venezuelan expatriate sportspeople in Romania
Liga I players